The Religious Zionism is an Israeli political alliance of right-wing parties that included the Tkuma, Noam, and Otzma Yehudit.

The list was created ahead of the 2021 Israeli legislative election, in which Religious Zionism secured six seats in the Knesset. On 14 June 2021, Ofir Sofer split from Likud and returned to Religious Zionism.

Ahead of the 25th Knesset elections, the Noam and Otzma Yehudit parties announced that they would run separately. On August 26, 2022, an agreement was signed between Bezalel Smotrich and Itamar Ben-Gvir, mediated by opposition chairman Benjamin Netanyahu, on joint balloting and the Noam and Otsma Yehudit parties returned to the alliance.

History

Elections for the 24th Knesset 
The list was founded on February 3, 2021, after Bezalel Smotrich decided not to run on a Yamina list led by Naftali Bennett.

Ofir Sofer, a representative of the National Union, was placed by Likud leader Benjamin Netanyahu in the 28th spot on the Likud list for the Knesset. He formally ran as a representative of the "One Future - A Better Future for Israel" party. Netanyahu did this as a gesture to gain the approval of the National Union for a joint run, and after the elections, Sofer joined the Religious Zionism faction. Similarly, Eli Ben-Dahan, a representative of the Jewish Home, was placed on the Likud list in the 21st Knesset elections.

Elections for the 25th Knesset 
On May 30th, Smotrich announced at a party convention that primary elections would be held for the leadership and representatives of the Religious Zionist Party. Otzma Yehudit expressed opposition to the move, but later both Otzma Yehudit and Noam opened their own primaries in parallel to the Religious Zionist Party's. The Religious Zionist Party had about 25,000 registered members. Otzma Yehudit and Noam refused to disclose the number of their registered members.

Eighteen candidates submitted their candidacy for the party list. No one other than Smotrich submitted their candidacy for the leadership, and therefore he secured another term.

On August 15, 2022, ahead of the elections for the 25th Knesset and after the failure of negotiations for another joint run, Itamar Ben Gvir announced at a press conference in Ramat Gan that Otzma Yehudit would run independently in the elections. On August 26, after a joint meeting of Smotrich, Ben Gvir, and Netanyahu, Ben Gvir announced a joint run with the Religious Zionist Party under the name "Religious Zionism". The Noam party was offered the eleventh spot on the list, but they announced a separate run due to "the squeeze on Jewish identity in an unrealistic position."

On September 14, 2022, the Noam party received the eleventh spot on the joint list.

The parties split into three fractions in the Knesset on 20 November 2022.

Election results

References 

2021 in Israeli politics
2022 in Israeli politics
Orthodox Jewish political parties
Political party alliances in Israel
Religious Zionist political parties in Israel